The Central District of Anbarabad County is a district (bakhsh) in Anbarabad County, Kerman Province, Iran. At the 2006 census, its population was 52,777, in 11,209 families.  The district has two cities: Anbarabad and Dow Sari. The district has four rural districts (dehestan): Aliabad Rural District, Amjaz Rural District, Jahadabad Rural District, and Mohammadabad Rural District.

References 

Anbarabad County
Districts of Kerman Province